Aaron Fiora (born 19 April 1981) is a former Australian rules footballer who played for  and  in the Australian Football League (AFL).

Richmond career

Originally from Naracoorte, South Australia, Fiora played his junior football with Port Adelaide Football Club in the South Australian National Football League (SANFL) and made his senior debut with Port Adelaide in 1999.

Fiora was selected in the 1999 AFL draft at pick number three by the Richmond Football Club. Considered at the time to be one of the most talented young footballers in the world Fiora made his AFL debut in 2000, playing mainly as a wingman and showing pace and excellent oral skills.

St Kilda career

At the end of 2004 Fiora was traded to St Kilda as part of a deal involving Troy Simmonds and Heath Black. He was still a fringe player but played several solid games in 2005 before a quieter 2006 AFL season as he struggled with form despite playing 17 matches.

Fiora was retained when new coach Ross Lyon took over in 2007 and was given the number 17 jumper, previously worn by tough midfielder Stephen Powell. Under Lyon's tutelage Fiora enjoyed an excellent and consistent season, playing in all 22 matches.  However, after playing 10 matches in 2008, including a final, Fiora was delisted by St Kilda.

References

External links
 

1981 births
Living people
Richmond Football Club players
St Kilda Football Club players
Port Adelaide Magpies players
Casey Demons players
Coburg Football Club players
Australian rules footballers from South Australia
Australian people of Italian descent